Rhamphomyia hirsutipes is a species of fly in the family Empididae. It is include in the subgenus Amydroneura of the genus Rhamphomyia. It is found in the  Palearctic.

References

External links
Images representing Rhamphomyia at BOLD

Rhamphomyia
Insects described in 1926
Asilomorph flies of Europe